Glasgow Garscadden was a burgh constituency represented in the House of Commons of the Parliament of the United Kingdom from 1974 until 1997. It elected one Member of Parliament (MP) using the first-past-the-post voting system.

Boundaries
This constituency comprised the north western periphery of the City of Glasgow.

In 1974 Garscadden was defined as comprising the Knightswood and Yoker wards of Glasgow. Before the redistribution these areas had been part of the Glasgow Scotstoun constituency.

In the 1983 redistribution the seat was only changed slightly. The whole of the old Garscadden formed 98.5% of the new constituency. A small area, further in towards the city centre, was detached from the pre-1983 Glasgow Hillhead and contributed the remaining 1.5% of the new Garscadden's electorate.

In terms of City of Glasgow electoral divisions the 1983 seat was defined as 9 (Drumry/Summerhill), 10 (Blairdardie/Knightscliffe), and 11 (Yoker/Knightswood).

Members of Parliament

Election results

Elections of the 1970s

 Death of William Small 18 January 1978

Elections of the 1980s

Elections of the 1990s

See also 
 1978 Glasgow Garscadden by-election

References 

 The BBC/ITN Guide to the New House of Commons, (Parliamentary Research Services 1983)
 Boundaries of Parliamentary Constituencies 1885-1972, compiled and edited by F.W.S. Craig (Parliamentary Reference Publications 1972)
 British Parliamentary Election Results 1974-1983, compiled and edited by F.W.S. Craig (Parliamentary Research Services 1984)

Historic parliamentary constituencies in Scotland (Westminster)
Constituencies of the Parliament of the United Kingdom established in 1974
Constituencies of the Parliament of the United Kingdom disestablished in 1997
Politics of Glasgow
Drumchapel